Pediatric Transplantation is a monthly peer-reviewed medical journal covering pediatric  transplantation. It is the official journal of the International Pediatric Transplant Association. According to the Journal Citation Reports, the journal has a 2020 impact factor of 1.502.

References

External links 
 

English-language journals
Organ transplantation journals
Wiley (publisher) academic journals
Pediatrics journals
Monthly journals
Publications established in 1997